Smiles are facial expressions.

Smiles or SMILES may also refer to:

Arts and entertainment
Smiles (film), a 1919 American silent film
"Smiles" (Hitomi Shimatani song), 2009 
"Smiles" (1917 song), from The Passing Show of 1918
Smiles (musical), a 1930 Broadway musical with music by Vincent Youmans

People
Patricia Ford née Smiles (1921–1995), British politician
Samuel Smiles (1812–1904), Scottish author and reformer
Tom Smiles (fl. 1929–1930), English footballer 
Walter Smiles (1883–1953), British politician

Other uses
Smiles, slang for recreational drugs containing 2C-I or 25I-NBOMe 
Smiles S.A., a Brazilian company which manages Smiles loyalty program
Simplified molecular-input line-entry system (SMILES), chemistry notation

See also
Smile (disambiguation)